Patrick Harvey may refer to:

 Patrick Harvey (actor) (born 1984), Irish-Australian actor
 Patrick Harvey (pentathlete) (born 1935), British modern pentathlete
 Patrick Harvey (rugby union, born 1925) rugby union player who represented Australia
 Patrick Harvey (rugby union, born 1880) (1880-1949), rugby union player who represented New Zealand

See also
 Patrick Harvie (born 1973), Scottish politician